Join Network Studio() of Northeast Normal University China is affiliated with Student Career Service Center of NENU. This is a non-profit organization composed by some undergraduate students. All departments except Software Department of the studio are located at the administration building of the main campus of NENU, and Software Department is situated in the Jingyue campus.

History 
At the time of 1999, the informationization of the employment for graduates of China had not started yet, and there is hardly any specialized websites of employment information for graduates. Employment information service was in the stage of low efficiency and high cost, and paper was the medium used most commonly. The reformation on informationization of the employment and the idea of the invisible market on the World Wide Web had not been established on a large scale. The decision makers of the work on employment for students realized that it is necessary to construct a top-ranking employment information service system for ensuring the work on employment maintaining top-class. Join Network Studio was established at March 25, 2000 for this purpose.

The Name "Join" 
The name "Join" stands for "Job information", and the English word "join" implies the meaning of solidarity. The Chinese name "卓音" is transliterated according to the Mandarin pronunciation, meaning "voice of excellence". Members of the studio call themselves Joiners.

Departments 
Join Network Studio is composed of 5 departments: Technology Department, System Department, Information Department, Mastermind Department, and Software Department.

Works 
Main works by Join Network Studio include Employment Union of Normal Universities in Northeast China, Website of Student Career Service Center of NENU, Join Online, Feature Pages, graphic designs and some works aiding foreign.

See also 
Software industry in China
China Software Industry Association

References 

Companies established in 2000
Companies based in Jilin
Software companies of China